JLG/JLG – Self-Portrait in December is a 1995 French documentary film directed by Jean-Luc Godard.

Cast
 Jean-Luc Godard as himself
 Geneviève Pasquier
 Denis Jadót
 Brigitte Bastien
 Elisabeth Kaza
 André S. Labarthe
 Louis Seguin (as Louis Séguin)
 Bernard Eisenschitz

References

External links

1995 films
1995 drama films
1995 documentary films
French avant-garde and experimental films
1990s French-language films
French documentary films
Films directed by Jean-Luc Godard
Autobiographical documentary films
1990s avant-garde and experimental films
1990s French films